The Ra'ad ("Thunder") is a Pakistani air-launched cruise missile (ALCM) .  The missile was first tested in August 2007.

Development and design

The Ra'ad is a joint project developed by Pakistan Air Force's Air Weapons Complex and NESCOM– the civilian defense contractor. The missile's latest version has a range of 600 km. The 350 km-range missile uses stealth technology and can transport either conventional or nuclear warheads. As per media reports, the missile has features including low-altitude, terrain hugging missile with high maneuverability. The missile would probably be tasked for precision attacks on high value targets including command centres, radars, surface-to-air missile launchers, ballistic missile launchers and stationary warships.

Operational history
 
The first test of the missile was conducted on 25 August 2007. A second test was conducted on 8 May 2008, when it was fired from a Dassault Mirage III ROSE fighter of the Pakistan Air Force (PAF). A third test was carried out on 29 April 2011 from a Dassault Mirage fighter. The fourth test was carried out on 30 May 2012. A fifth test of the missile was carried out on 2 Feb 2015. A seventh test was carried out on 19 January 2016.

Though initial tests have been conducted from a PAF Dassault Mirage III ROSE combat aircraft there is potential to integrate this missile with other platforms such as the JF-17 aircraft.

Mark II 

A Mark II version of the missile was revealed on Pakistan parade day in 2017, with increased range of 600 km.

See also
Related developments
 Babur (cruise missile)
Similar missiles
 AGM-158 JASSM
 TAURUS KEPD 350
 SOM (missile)
 Storm Shadow
Related lists
 List of missiles
 List of missiles by country

References

External links
 Jane's Air-Launched Weapons article – Ra'ad (Hatf-8) (Pakistan)
 CSIS Missile Threat- Hatf 8

Cruise missiles of Pakistan
Nuclear missiles of Pakistan
Air-to-surface missiles of Pakistan
Guided missiles of Pakistan
Military equipment introduced in the 2000s